Legislative elections were held in Macau on 25 September 2005.

Electoral system
Twelve candidates are elected directly using the highest averages method on party lists with divisors of 1,2,4,8 etc. There are 18 party lists, the highest ever, with a total of 125 candidates, also the highest ever. 5 of the lists are related to gambling.

10 candidates are elected by the functional constituencies. The seats are distributed like the directly elected seats. There is one list for each category. There are:
 4 seats for employers
 2 seats for labour
 2 seats for special interests and
 2 seats for charity, culture, education and sport

7 seats are appointed by the Chief Executive.

Related events
A candidate (汪長南) was bashed on the head. Police arrested 3 suspects. A reporter was beaten up while investigating a possibly corrupt candidate. The Commission Against Corruption received 93 complaints.

Even with a typhoon signal no. 3 issued, the turnout for the direct election was a historic 58.39%. 128,830 people voted out of 220,653. The turnout for the functional constituencies was 61.95%. 2704 people voted.

Results

Geographical constituencies

Functional constituencies (10 seats)

Nominated Members (7 seats)
Members appointed by the Chief Executive Edmund Ho Hau Wah
 Lei Pui Lam 
 Sam Chan Io 
 Tsui Wai Kwan 
 "José" Chui Sai Peng 
 Philip Xavier 
 Ieong Tou Hong 
 Lao Pun Lap

References

Further reading
 https://web.archive.org/web/20070929102419/http://full.mingpaonews.com/20050926/gob1.htm

External links
 Official website 
 Official website 
 Official results

2005
2005 elections in China
2005 in Macau